World War II Lost Films is a documentary assembled from archive footage from the World War II period.

See also
WWII in HD: Lost Films is the first documentary to show World War II as it really was, in original, immersive colour.

References

External links
 WWII Lost Films Video

Documentary films about World War II